Quairading is a Western Australian town located in the Wheatbelt region. It is the seat of government for the Shire of Quairading.

History
The town was named for Quairading Spring, derived from a local Aboriginal word recorded in 1872 by surveyor Alexander Forrest. The first European settler in the area is believed to be Stephen Parker, who settled in nearby York. From 1859 to 1863, his son Edward Parker cleared land east of York towards Dangin, before Edward's son Jonah took over Dangin and the surrounding area. Jonah Parker subdivided his property and made Dangin a private townsite, surrounded by his land. A Methodist, Jonah Parker banned alcohol in the town and these factors led to residents leaving Dangin. The Government made available new land in nearby Quairading, and gave settlers a  block for free if they cleared the land and lived there for seven years. Many settlers took up the offer and moved into the area between 1903 and 1908.

The Greenhills Road Board, established in 1892, decided to build a railway from Greenhills (near York) to Quairading and gazette the townsite at the Quairading terminus. The townsite was gazetted on 7 August 1907 and the railway completed in 1908. By 1909, the town had a hotel, general store, blacksmith, baker, carpenter and two banks, and by 1950, most of the land was cleared and being used for farming.

In 1932 the Wheat Pool of Western Australia announced that the town would have two grain elevators, each fitted with an engine, installed at the railway siding.

The area was rocked by an earthquake in April 2009; the epicentre was located approximately 20 km northwest of the town. The earthquake that measured 3.2 on the Richter Scale happened at 4.50am local time caused no damage.

Railway
See also York–Bruce Rock railway line

The railway through Quairading began as the York to Greenhills line (about a sixth the length of the whole line), and this was later extended to Quairading and onward to Bruce Rock. Construction began in 1897. Due to various operational changes the line between Quairading and Bruce Rock was closed in the 1970s, and the line from York was closed in October 2013, the operator Brookfield Rail citing safety as the primary reason. The decision to close this half of the line was politically contentious, with Brookfield Rail taking pains to point out that it was not politics that forced the closure, and community groups (such as the Wheatbelt Rail Retention Alliance) campaigning against it.

Demographics
The median age of residents was 49 years, compared to the national median age of 37. The religious affiliation of residents was Anglican 31.4%, Catholic 19.3%, no religion 16.1%, Uniting Church 12.9% and Pentecostal 1.8%. The percentage of people identifying themselves as Anglican (31.4%) was significantly higher than the Australia-wide average of 18.7%. 90.4% of residents were Australian citizens, with English the language spoken at home by 95.6% persons, compared to the national average of 78.5%. The most common occupations were labourers 18.4%, managers 17.0%, technicians and trades workers 15.7%, machinery operators and drivers 10.8%, and sales workers 10.3%. The major industries were farming of sheep, beef cattle and grain 14.8%, local government administration 10.3%, school education 8.5%, wholesaling of specialised industrial machinery and equipment 4.9%, and retailing of fuel 4.9%. The median household weekly income was $637, compared to $1,027 nationally.

Amenities and facilities

The Pink Lake of Quairading which lies 11 km east of Quairading on the Bruce Rock Road at Badjaling, with the road traversing it. It is regarded as a phenomenon, as certain times in the year one side has a distinctive pink colour whilst the other side remains its natural blue.

A local tourist attraction is the Quairading Nature Reserve,  of native bushland west of the town along the railway line to York. The reserve contains York gum, salmon gum, wandoo and casuarina trees, and wildlife including the eastern wallaroo, western grey kangaroo, echidnas, reptiles and birds. Nookaminnie Rock, which is a large granite rock, provides a view over the town and surrounding areas.

Founded by local artist Ian Wills, it displays his wood sculptures, which have been exhibited in Sydney, Adelaide and Perth. The wood sculptures are now on display in the Old Railway Station Info Centre and is open every weekday morning by volunteers.

The town has a library, located at Quairading Bookpost, a very popular Community Resource Centre and a number of small parks, including a memorial rose garden, and a public swimming pool. The Greater Sports Ground is home to football, hockey, cricket and netball.

See also
 The Avon Gazette and York Times

References

External links

Shire of Quairading

Towns in Western Australia
Grain receival points of Western Australia
Shire of Quairading